The University Hospital of Basel (German: Universitätsspital Basel, USB), in Basel, is one of the five university hospitals of Switzerland. Since 1842 it is located in a former palace, the Markgräflerhof.

USB brings together 50 clinics, units and institutes all working together in an interdisciplinary manner and employs a staff of about 5000. Since the beginning of 2012, the University Hospital has been an independent business. Following its spin-off from the state administration of the Canton of Basel-Stadt, it now has the organisational form of a state-owned enterprise.

With its 7,219 employees (as of 31 December 2017), who treat around 38,000 inpatients per year (as of 2017), the University Hospital Basel is one of the largest employers in the region. A characteristic feature is its close relationship with the University of Basel and the life sciences companies based in the region. With an approximate 670 beds, USB is the biggest healthcare facility in north-western Switzerland.

USB provides services in all fields of medicine apart from pediatrics.

In 1953 the hospital was one of the first that did extensive research on the first neuroleptic Chlorpromazine.

The hospital is well known for its special form of hormone-delivered radiotherapy to treat neuroendocrine cancer, tried by Steve Jobs in 2009.

See also 
 University of Basel

References

External links 

 

Teaching hospitals in Switzerland
University of Basel